Mary de Rachewiltz (born Maria Rudge; July 9, 1925) is an Italian-American poet and translator.

Early life and education
De Rachewiltz was born Maria Rudge in Brixen, Italy, on July 9, 1925, the daughter of Olga Rudge, a classical violinist, and Ezra Pound, who was married to Dorothy Shakespear. Her mother placed the girl in the care of a peasant couple after her birth; she was raised on their farm in Gais in the Italian Tyrol. She grew up on a farm speaking the local dialect of German, but when she was older, she began to join her mother, and sometimes Pound, at Olga's house in Venice. There Maria was exposed to a world of culture, literature and politics. In the Tyrolean village, she had access to only two books, but when with her parents, she made full use of a large library, was expected to speak Italian, and wear white gloves. As a teenager, she moved away from the mountains and at that point, Pound took her education in hand. During World War II while Pound was making fascist radio broadcasts for Rome radio, he simultaneously took time to teach his daughter literature, telling her "I can only teach you the profession I know."

Middle years
During World War II Olga lost possession of her home in Venice, and Maria moved for a period with her mother to Rapallo. She was later sent back to Gais when Pound brought his legal wife, Dorothy Shakespear, to live with Olga for a period during the war. During this time, Rudge worked in a German hospital in Italy. She was 19 when her father finally told her about his other family: his wife Shakespear and son Omar, Maria's half-brother. When she returned to Rapallo, she found her father had been arrested by U.S. authorities on treason charges because of his wartime broadcasts; he was being held at the "Disciplinary Training Center" in Pisa. Pound was taken from Pisa to the U.S., where he was found mentally incompetent for trial. He was committed for the next 12 years at St. Elizabeths Hospital, where he continued to intermittently write, and receive his wife, friends and literary visitors. On his release Pound returned to Italy. He lived for a period with Mary and her family estate castle Brunnenburg.

In 1946, Mary married Egyptologist Boris de Rachewiltz. A son was born the next year, followed by a daughter two years later. They bought and renovated for their residence Brunnenburg castle in the Italian Tyrol. She published an autobiography Discretions in 1971. The following year, her father died in Venice.

In the 1980s de Rachewiltz published the first dual-language edition of her father's epic poem The Cantos, which he began work on in the years before 1915 and continued throughout his life until his death. She is curator of the Ezra Pound Archive, Center for the Study of Ezra Pound and His Contemporaries, Beinecke Rare Book and Manuscript Library at Yale University. De Rachewiltz studied at Radcliffe College between 1973 and 1975. She has presented lectures about her father's work and modernist poetry throughout the U.S. and Canada. She collected and co-edited with biographer David Moody, her father's letters written to his parents, published in 2011 as Ezra Pound to His Parents.

Today        
De Rachewiltz continues to live at the Brunnenburg. She teaches a class on her father's literature for the Brunnenburg exchange program, in which several American universities participate.

Work
 30 Poesie: Versione di Mary de Rachewiltz (1961), translations of e.e. Cummings
 Maschere Tirolesi (1964), editor
 Il Diapason (1965)
 Discretions (1971) memoirs
 A Catalogue of the Poetry Notebooks of Ezra Pound (1980), with Diane Ross and Donald Gallup
 Whose World? Selected Poems (1998)
 Veneziane Cantos (2001), Italian translations from The Cantos
 For the Wrong Reason (2002)
 Moscardino (2004), with Enrico Pea
 Ezra Pound, éducateur et père / Discrétions, Paris, Pierre-Guillaume de Roux, May 2017 (translated by Claire Vajou)

References

External links
 Ezra Pound Papers, Beinecke Rare Book and Manuscript Library

1925 births
Living people
Italian women poets
People from Brixen
Italian poets
Italian people of American descent